Thinking Room is the debut album by New Zealand Pop recording artist Anika Moa, released on 28 September 2001 by Warner, Atlantic Records. It reached number one on the New Zealand Albums Chart and was certified double platinum selling over 30,000 copies in New Zealand.

Chart performance
The album debuted at number one on the New Zealand charts in October 2001 and stayed in the top spot for two weeks. The album has gone double platinum, having sold over 30,000 copies, and yielding four hit singles, two of which ("Youthful" and "Falling in Love Again") peaked at number five on the New Zealand Singles Chart.

"Falling in Love Again" featured in the film America's Sweethearts in 2001.

Track listing
All songs written and composed by Anika Moa, along with others credited for specific tracks below.

Personnel
Musicians
Anika Moa – vocals (all tracks), acoustic guitar (1, 2, 4-7, 10, 11), electric guitar (10), keyboards (10)
Des Broadbery – additional programming (9)
Matt Chamberlain – drums (1, 2, 5-8, 10, 11), percussion (1, 2, 5, 7, 10)
Knox Chandler – bass (5, 11), electric guitar (1, 3, 5, 8), mandolin (5, 8)
Sean Eden – electric guitar (6, 7)
Chris Feinstein – bass (1, 2, 6-8, 10)
Adam Peters – backing vocals (10, 11), cello (1, 2, 6, 7, 9), acoustic guitar (2, 8), electric guitar (1, 3, 5-7, 10), keyboards (3-6, 9-11), programming (4-6, 9, 11)
Britta Phillips – backing vocals (8)
Chad Royce – percussion (5, 8, 11)
Eric Schermerhorn – acoustic guitar (1-3, 6, 8, 10, 11), 12-string acoustic guitar (2, 5, 6), electric guitar (3, 8)
Bruce Smith – drum programming (3)
Victor Van Vugt – programming (5)

Technical
Victor Van Vugt – production (all tracks), recording (all tracks), mixing (1, 2, 4-11)
Chris Lord-Alge – mixing (3)
Kaori Kinoshita – engineering assistance
Stephen Marcussen – mastering (all tracks)
Steve Mazur – engineering assistance
Matt Silva – engineering assistance
Stewart Whitmore – digital editing

Design & management
Richard Bates – art direction, design
Christina Dittmar – art direction, design
Tim Groenendaal – management
Craig Owen – photography
Skye Peyton – photography
John Rubeli – artists and repertoire

Source: CD liner

Charts

Weekly charts

Year-end charts

References

Anika Moa albums
2001 debut albums
Albums produced by Victor Van Vugt